Logorik, Subori, or Saburi, is a (critically) endangered language spoken in Eastern Sudan and Western Chad.

General information 
It is a part of the Nilo-Saharan group and the subcategory of the Eastern Daju languages. It is spoken by the Subori people in the Nuba Mountains and South Kordofan.

Meinhof claims, that there are hardly any similarities between this language and other Kordofan languages vocabulary-wise. At the same time, the Logorik-speaking community is overwhelmingly bilingual; other dominating languages being, among others, Arabic, (due to the Arabic migration in the region). This causes a high percentage of loanwords and grammatical borrowings (mostly Arabic) in the Logorik language.

Phonetics

Vowels

Consonants 

*The labiodental "f" is quite rare and it usually appears in loanwords and other borrowings from foreign languages.

Also, it is worth mentioning, that the glottal stops, symbolized by (ʔ), are present in Logorik.

Tonality 
Logorik is a tonal language, meaning there are high tones and falling tones. When it comes to tones, the tone of a preceding syllable must be different from the one coming after it.

Grammar

Genus 
There is no feminine genus in the Logorik language morphology-wise. There are however six other classes and their plural form depends on the final position of the singular form.

Nouns 
A plural form of a noun is created by adding an appropriate suffix.

Verbs 
There are only perfective and imperfective conjugations documented. Prefixes and suffixes play a very important role in signaling the context/tense, e.g. future tense is shown by the prefix and háŋ-; habitual activities by a suffix -cà.

References

External links
Subori basic lexicon at the Global Lexicostatistical Database

Critically endangered languages
Daju languages